John Wilder Miles (December 1, 1920 – October 20, 2008) was a research professor emeritus of applied mechanics and geophysics at Scripps Institution of Oceanography, University of California, San Diego. He was well regarded for his pioneering work in theoretical fluid mechanics, and made fundamental contributions to understanding how wind energy transfers to waves.

Career
The first 20 years of Miles' research was devoted to electrical and aeronautical engineering. He turned his mathematical abilities to geophysical fluid dynamics when he joined Scripps, and made numerous contributions to all aspects of fluid dynamics, including supersonic flow, ocean tides, the stability of currents and water waves and their nonlinear interactions, as well as extensive work in the application of mathematical methods.

Throughout his career, he wrote more than 400 publications. He has the unique distinction of being the only fluid mechanics researcher to have published more than hundred scientific research articles (117) in Journal of Fluid Mechanics.

A postdoctoral fellowship has been established in his honor at the Scripps Institution of Oceanography.

Selected publications

References

External links
 
John Miles Papers MSS 453. Special Collections & Archives, UC San Diego Library.
 

1920 births
2008 deaths
Fluid dynamicists
California Institute of Technology alumni
University of California, San Diego faculty